The Vagabonds is a 1912 American silent film produced by Kalem Company. It was directed by Sidney Olcott with himself, Gene Gauntier and Jack J. Clark in the leading roles.

Cast
 Gene Gauntier as Nell
 Sidney Olcott as Tom
 Jack J. Clark as The Violinist
 Alice Hollister as Jane

Production notes
The film was shot in Beaufort, County Kerry, and Ireland, during summer of 1911.

References
 Michel Derrien, Aux origines du cinéma irlandais: Sidney Olcott, le premier oeil, TIR 2013.

External links

 The Vagabonds website dedicated to Sidney Olcott

1912 films
Silent American drama films
American silent short films
Films set in Ireland
Films shot in Ireland
Films directed by Sidney Olcott
1912 short films
1912 drama films
American black-and-white films
1910s American films